The 1965 Women's World Chess Championship was won by Nona Gaprindashvili, who successfully defended her title against challenger Alla Kushnir in what was to be the first of three consecutive title matches between the two strongest female players of their time.

1964 Candidates Tournament

The Candidates Tournament was held in Sukhumi in September and October 1964. Three players were tied for first place, but Kushnir won the playoff in Moscow in December 1964 and earned the right to challenge the reigning champion Gaprindashvili.

{| class="wikitable"
|+ 1964 Women's Candidates Tournament
|-
! !! Player !! 1 !! 2 !! 3 !! 4 !! 5 !! 6 !! 7 !! 8 !! 9 !! 10 !! 11 !! 12 !! 13 !! 14 !! 15 !! 16 !! 17 !! 18 !! Points !! Tie break
|- style="background:#ccffcc;"
| 1 ||  || - || 1 || 1 || ½ || ½ || 1 || 0 || ½ || 1 || 1 || ½ || 1 || 1 || 0 || 1 || 1 || ½ || 1 || 12½ || 102.00
|- style="background:#ccffcc;"
| 2 ||  || 0 || - || 0 || 1 || ½ || 1 || 1 || 1 || 0 || ½ || 1 || 1 || ½ || 1 || 1 || 1 || 1 || 1 || 12½ || 93.50
|- style="background:#ccffcc;"
| 3 ||  || 0 || 1 || - || 0 || ½ || 1 || ½ || 0 || 1 || 1 || 1 || 1 || ½ || 1 || 1 || 1 || 1 || 1 || 12½ || 93.25
|-
| 4 ||  || ½ || 0 || 1 || - || ½ || 1 || ½ || 1 || 1 || 1 || 0 || 1 || 0 || 1 || 1 || ½ || 0 || 1 || 11 || 91.25
|-
| 5 ||  || ½ || ½ || ½ || ½ || - || ½ || 0 || ½ || ½ || ½ || 1 || 1 || 1 || 1 || ½ || ½ || 1 || 1 || 11 || 82.50
|-
| 6 ||  || 0 || 0 || 0 || 0 || ½ || - || ½ || 1 || ½ || 0 || 1 || 1 || 1 || 1 || 1 || 1 || 1 || 1 || 10½ || 
|-
| 7 ||  || 1 || 0 || ½ || ½ || 1 || ½ || - || 1 || 0 || 0 || ½ || 0 || ½ || 1 || 1 || ½ || 1 || 1 || 10 || 78.75
|-
| 8 ||  || ½ || 0 || 1 || 0 || ½ || 0 || 0 || - || 1 || 1 || 1 || 1 || 1 || 0 || 1 || ½ || ½ || 1 || 10 || 75.75
|-
| 9 ||  || 0 || 1 || 0 || 0 || ½ || ½ || 1 || 0 || - || 1 || 1 || 0 || 1 || ½ || 1 || 0 || 1 || ½ || 9 || 
|-
| 10 ||  || 0 || ½ || 0 || 0 || ½ || 1 || 1 || 0 || 0 || - || 0 || 1 || ½ || 1 || ½ || 1 || ½ || 1 || 8½ || 
|-
| 11 ||  || ½ || 0 || 0 || 1 || 0 || 0 || ½ || 0 || 0 || 1 || - || 1 || ½ || ½ || 0 || 1 || 1 || 1 || 8 || 
|-
| 12 ||  || 0 || 0 || 0 || 0 || 0 || 0 || 1 || 0 || 1 || 0 || 0 || - || 1 || ½ || 1 || ½ || 1 || 1 || 7 || 
|-
| 13 ||  || 0 || ½ || ½ || 1 || 0 || 0 || ½ || 0 || 0 || ½ || ½ || 0 || - || ½ || 0 || ½ || 1 || 1 || 6½ || 48.00
|-
| 14 ||  || 1 || 0 || 0 || 0 || 0 || 0 || 0 || 1 || ½ || 0 || ½ || ½ || ½ || - || 0 || ½ || 1 || 1 || 6½ || 45.75
|-
| 15 ||  || 0 || 0 || 0 || 0 || ½ || 0 || 0 || 0 || 0 || ½ || 1 || 0 || 1 || 1 || - || ½ || 1 || 1 || 6½ || 38.75
|-
| 16 ||  || 0 || 0 || 0 || ½ || ½ || 0 || ½ || ½ || 1 || 0 || 0 || ½ || ½ || ½ || ½ || - || ½ || ½ || 6 || 
|-
| 17 ||  || ½ || 0 || 0 || 1 || 0 || 0 || 0 || ½ || 0 || ½ || 0 || 0 || 0 || 0 || 0 || ½ || - || 1 || 4 || 
|-
| 18 ||  || 0 || 0 || 0 || 0 || 0 || 0 || 0 || 0 || ½ || 0 || 0 || 0 || 0 || 0 || 0 || ½ || 0 || - || 1 || 
|}

{| class="wikitable"
|+ 1964 Women's Candidates Playoff Tournament
! !! Player !! 1 !! 2 !! 3 !! Total
|- style="background:#ccffcc;"
| 1 ||  || - || 0 1 || 1 ½ || 2½
|-
| 2 ||  || 1 0 || - || 1 0 || 2
|-
| 3 ||  || 0 ½ || 0 1 || - || 1½
|}

1965 Championship Match

The championship match was played in Riga in 1965. Despite valiant opposition from Kushnir, Gaprindashvili's victory was never really in doubt.

{| class="wikitable" style="text-align:center"
|+Women's World Championship Match 1965
|-
! !! 1 !! 2 !! 3 !! 4 !! 5 !! 6 !! 7 !! 8 !! 9 !! 10 !! 11 !! 12 !! 13 !! Total
|-
| align=left | 
| 0 ||style="background:black; color:white"| 1 || ½ ||style="background:black; color:white"| 0 || 0 ||style="background:black; color:white"| ½ || 0 ||style="background:black; color:white"| 0 || ½ ||style="background:black; color:white"| 1 || 0 ||style="background:black; color:white"| 1 || 0 || 4½
|-
| align=left | 
|style="background:black; color:white"| 1 || 0 ||style="background:black; color:white"| ½ || 1 ||style="background:black; color:white"| 1 || ½ ||style="background:black; color:white"| 1 || 1 ||style="background:black; color:white"| ½ || 0 ||style="background:black; color:white"| 1 || 0 ||style="background:black; color:white"| 1 || 8½
|}

References

Women's World Chess Championships
1965 in chess